Sioni is a townlet in Georgia, the part of Tianeti Municipality, in the Mtskheta-Mtianeti region. Located  from the Tbilisi railway station, it arose in 1951 during the construction of the Sioni reservoir. Sioni obtained status of a townlet in 1960. Until the 1970s, it was called Sionmsheni.

References

External links

Cities and towns in Mtskheta-Mtianeti